The Hertfordshire Association for Local History exists to promote the study and enjoyment
of history in Hertfordshire, England. The association publishes a journal, Herts Past and Present, and a book series, Hertfordshire Publications, in association with the University of Hertfordshire Press. The Hertfordshire Publications book series has been in existence for over 40 years and has been an imprint of the university since 2001.

Selected publications
Gear, Gillian. (2001) Community Life in Hertfordshire 2000. 
Munby, Lionel M. (2001) The Common People are Not Nothing: Conflict in Religion and Politics in Hertfordshire, 1575–1780. 
Tomkins, Malcolm. (2001) So That Was Hertfordshire: Travellers' Jottings 1322–1887. 
King, Steve, & Gillian Gear. (2013) A Caring County? Social Welfare in Hertfordshire from 1600. University of Hertfordshire Press. 
Lockyear, Kris. (Ed.) (2015) Archaeology in Hertfordshire: Recent Research A Festschrift for Tony Rook. University of Hertfordshire Press.

References

External links

History of Hertfordshire
Historical societies of the United Kingdom